Mahnomen County is a county in the U.S. state of Minnesota. As of the 2020 census, the population was 5,411. Its county seat is Mahnomen.

The county is part of the White Earth Indian Reservation. It is the only county in Minnesota entirely within an Indian reservation. Mahnomen, East Polk, and Becker counties constitute one of northwestern Minnesota's biggest cattle-raising areas.

History
The county was created from the east half of Norman County on December 27, 1906, with Mahnomen, a former railway station town, as the county seat. The county was named for the town, the name of which is one spelling of the Ojibwe word for "wild rice".

Geography
The Wild Rice River enters the county from Clearwater County and flows west through the central part of the county. The White Earth River originates from White Earth Lake on the county's southern border and flows northwest to its confluence with the Wild Rice near Mahnomen. The county terrain consists of low rolling hills, carved with drainages. The eastern part of the county is dotted with lakes and ponds and largely wooded. All non-wooded areas are devoted to agriculture where possible. The county slopes to the west and north, with its highest point near the middle of the east border, at 1,825' (556m) ASL. Mahnomen is one of 17 Minnesota savanna region counties with more savanna soils than either prairie or forest soils.

Major highways
  U.S. Highway 59
  Minnesota State Highway 113
  Minnesota State Highway 200

Airports
 Mahnomen County Airport (3N8) - south of Mahnomen

Adjacent counties

 Polk County - north
 Clearwater County - east
 Becker County - south
 Norman County - west

Protected areas

 Beaulife State Wildlife Management Area
 Bejou State Wildlife Management Area
 Budde Meadow State Wildlife Management Area
 Dittmer State Wildlife Management Area
 Foot State Wildlife Management Area
 Hasselton State Wildlife Management Area (part)
 Loncrace State Wildlife Management Area
 Mahgre State Wildlife Management Area
 Rush Lake State Wildlife Management Area
 Santee Prairie Scientific and Natural Area
 Wambach State Wildlife Management Area
 Warren Lake State Wildlife Management Area

Demographics

2000 census
As of the 2000 census, there were 5,190 people, 1,969 households, and 1,366 families in the county. The population density was 9.3/sqmi (3.59/km2). There were 2,700 housing units at an average density of 4.84/sqmi (1.87/km2). The racial makeup of the county was 62.85% White (3,262 people) 0.13% Black or African American (7 people), 28.55% Native American (1,482 people), 0.06% Asian (3 people), 0.31% from other races (16 people), and 8.09% (420 people) from two or more races. 0.89% of the population (46 people) were Hispanic or Latino of any race. 29.4% (1525 people) were of German and 17.0% (882 people) Norwegian ancestry.

There were 1,969 households, out of which 32.40% had children under the age of 18 living with them, 51.60% were married couples living together, 11.60% had a female householder with no husband present, and 30.60% were non-families. 27.00% of all households were made up of individuals, and 14.90% had someone living alone who was 65 years of age or older.  The average household size was 2.60 and the average family size was 3.14.

The county population contained 29.20% under the age of 18, 7.20% from 18 to 24, 23.50% from 25 to 44, 23.40% from 45 to 64, and 16.70% who were 65 years of age or older. The median age was 38 years. For every 100 females there were 102.90 males. For every 100 females age 18 and over, there were 98.40 males.

The median income for a household in the county was $30,053, and the median income for a family was $35,500. Males had a median income of $23,614 versus $21,000 for females. The per capita income for the county was $13,438.  About 11.80% of families and 16.70% of the population were below the poverty line, including 21.30% of those under age 18 and 15.30% of those age 65 or over.

2020 Census

Communities

Cities
 Bejou
 Mahnomen (county seat)
 Waubun

Census-designated places

 Beaulieu
 Midway
 Naytahwaush
 Pine Bend
 Riverland
 Roy Lake
 The Ranch
 Twin Lakes
 West Roy Lake

Unincorporated community
 Mahkonce

Townships

 Beaulieu Township
 Bejou Township
 Chief Township
 Clover Township
 Gregory Township
 Heier Township
 Island Lake Township
 La Garde Township
 Lake Grove Township
 Little Elbow Township
 Marsh Creek Township
 Oakland Township
 Pembina Township
 Popple Grove Township
 Rosedale Township
 Twin Lakes Township

Government and Politics
For several decades, Mahnomen County voters have tended to vote Democratic. As of 2020 the county has selected the Democratic candidate in six of the past nine presidential elections.

See also
 National Register of Historic Places listings in Mahnomen County, Minnesota
 USS Mahnomen County (LST-912)

References

External links
 County of Mahnomen website http://www.co.mahnomen.mn.us/

 
Minnesota counties
Minnesota placenames of Native American origin
1906 establishments in Minnesota
Populated places established in 1906